Maculauger minipulcher is a species of sea snail, a marine gastropod mollusk in the family Terebridae, the auger snails.

Description
The length of the shell varies between 7 mm and 20 mm.

Distribution
This marine species occurs off Southern Madagascar.

References

 Bozzetti L. (2008) Two new Terebridae (Gastropoda: Neogastropoda: Terebridae) from Southern Madagascar. Malacologia Mostra Mondiale 58: 3-4
 Terryn Y. & Rosado J. (2011) Further terebrid discoveries from Mozambique. Gloria Maris 50(6): 140-152

External links
 Fedosov, A. E.; Malcolm, G.; Terryn, Y.; Gorson, J.; Modica, M. V.; Holford, M.; Puillandre, N. (2020). Phylogenetic classification of the family Terebridae (Neogastropoda: Conoidea). Journal of Molluscan Studies

Terebridae
Gastropods described in 2008